Terrisporobacter is a genus of Gram-positive spore-forming bacteria in the family Peptostreptococcaceae. Members of this genus were once classified as Clostridium until phylogenetic data revealed it should be a distinct genus.

References

Gram-positive bacteria
Peptostreptococcaceae
Bacteria genera
Taxa described in 2014